Lavar or LaVar may refer to:

People with the given name
LaVar Arrington (born 1978), American football player
LaVar Ball (born 1968), American media personality 
LaVar Christensen, American politician
Lavar Glover (born 1978), Canadian football player
Lavar Johnson (born 1977), American mixed martial artist
Lavar McMillan, American politician
LaVar Payne (born 1945), Canadian politician

Places
Lavar-e Gol, Bushehr Province, Iran
Lavar-e Razemi, Bushehr Province, Iran
Lavar-e Saheli, Bushehr Province, Iran
Lavar, Gilan, Iran
Lavar, Bandar Abbas, Hormozgan Province, Iran
Lavar, Bastak, Hormozgan Province, Iran
Lavar-e Sofla, Hormozgan Province, Iran
Lavar, Kohgiluyeh and Boyer-Ahmad, Iran
Lavardin (disambiguation), multiple locations

See also
Levar (disambiguation)